Castril, former Castril de la Peña, is a municipality located in the province of Granada, Spain.

Administration 
Castril includes the following communities (2006):
Almontaras                
Castril                   
Cebas                     
Fátima                    
Fuente Vera               
Martín

Twin towns
 Azinhaga, Portugal
 Eberstadt, Germany
 Montescudaio, Italy
 Tías, Spain

References

Municipalities in the Province of Granada